The Thirst Project is a non-profit organization whose aim is to bring safe drinking water to communities around the world where it is not immediately available. The Thirst Project raises money and builds Water, Sanitation, & Hygiene projects in communities that do not have immediate access to safe, clean drinking water. Actors Drake Bell, Ansel Elgort, Dylan O'Brien, Jennifer Lawrence and Chyler Leigh are supporters, as were the late Cameron Boyce and Naya Rivera. Cameron Boyce alone raised over $30,000 for Thirst Project, followed by another $15,000 raised in honor of Boyce in a fundraiser organized by Adam Sandler after Boyce's death by SUDEP.

History
The organization was founded in 2008 in Los Angeles, by several college students who learned about the international water crisis and wanted to make a difference.

In 2012, Thirst Project pledged to bring clean water to the entire Kingdom of eSwatini by 2022; 1 decade to bring the goal to life. While many non-profits have been making progress on solving the water crisis, no organization has focused efforts specifically in one country, with the goal of bringing an entire nation clean water. The eSwatini project will work as a case study about the positive effects of bringing clean water to a developing country and will demonstrate benefits such as improved education and heightened development.

While most of Thirst Project's efforts are focused in the Kingdom of eSwatini, they are also operating in India, Uganda, El Salvador and Kenya.

Thirst Project recently collaborated with Minerva Model United Nations founded by Arsh Arora and Yash Maheshwari. As of February 2021, Thirst Project had another collaboration, this time with Key Club International to encourage the drinking of 64 ounces of clean water each day. This collaboration was known as "Hydrate for 28."

Statistics
According to Thirst Project's Website as of February 22, 2021, almost 500,000 people have been served by the funds raised by the organization and the students it works with. Over $10 million have been raised for the 13 countries the group works in.

Partners
Thirst Project donates 100% of general donations to end the water crisis. Their partners who pay their other expenses include:
Kiwanis
Morton Salt
Lionsgate
Follett
Contiki
Temple Hill Productions
Paul Mitchell Schools
72andSunny
Stance
Not Vodka
Genexa
Andrew Gomez Dream Foundation
20th Century Fox
DoSomething.org
Vizio
Apex Leadership Co.
Tea Drops
Eden
Liquid Death
MacKnight Food Group
Zox
Tender Greens

References

External links
 
 
 
 

Organizations established in 2007
Non-profit organizations based in Los Angeles
Sustainability organizations
Water organizations in the United States